The Lifelong Learning Programme 2007–2013 in Finland consisted of the Finnish participation in the Lifelong Learning Programme 2007–2013 of the European Union.

The program was coordinated by a unit of the Ministry of Education and Culture, Finland, the Centre for International Mobility. Finland has been a member of the European Union since 1 January 1995, and has taken part in the previous educational programmes.

Educational level oriented programmes
The Comenius programme for improving teaching and learning skills and improving mobility of teachers and students in the EU, to which is devoted 15% of the total Finnish budget for these programs. Some of the participating educational units in Finland:
Ahmon koulu, Siilinjärvi, an upper primary school
Helsingin medialukio, Helsinki, the Mind the Gap – three European Generations project together with German, Italian, Norwegian, Polish and Spanish participating schools
Härkävehmaan koulu, Hyvinkää, an internationalisation course; drafting an article to the paper of the foreign sister school and preparing a ten-minute video presentation
Kaitaan lukio, Espoo, a secondary school
Kiuruveden yläkoulu, Kiuruvesi municipality, an upper primary school
Lapin ammattiopisto, Rovaniemi, the VOICE project with Bladel of the Netherlands and Göttingen of Germany, a secondary level vocational school
Martinniemen päiväkoti, Haukipudas, a kindergarten
Myrskylän Kirkonkylän koulu, Myrskylä, the project "Coast to Country to Culture" with Cliftonville Primary (Ulster), CEIP Miraflores (Spain) and Merivälja Kool (Estonia).
Myllytullin koulu, Oulu, an upper primary school
Nurmon yläaste, Nurmo of Seinäjoki town, an upper primary school
Ruoveden Yhteiskoulu, Ruovesi,<ref>http://www.cimo.fi/ohjelmat/comenius/kokemuksia/koulujen_comenius-blogi/cb_blogiarkisto/101/0<//kcb_hyva_mieli_saa_viihtymaan_2</ref> an upper primary school, classes 7–9
the ERASMUS programme, with 45% of the budget. A number of educational units in Finland participate:
the Grundtvig programme, with 4% of the budget 
the Leonardo da Vinci programme, for encouraging artistic and creative activity, with 25% of the budget 
 participating educational units in Finland

Transversal programmes
the transversal programme, with 5% of the budget  Some of the participating educational units in Finland are:
the Jean Monnet programme, for encouraging research in European integration, with 2% of the budget. Some of the participating educational units in Finland are:

References

Learning programs
Lifelong learning
Education in Finland